Bułkowizna  is a village in the administrative district of Gmina Bargłów Kościelny, within Augustów County, Podlaskie Voivodeship, in north-eastern Poland.

The village has an approximate population of 129.

References

Villages in Augustów County